The 1st Connecticut House of Representatives district elects one member of the Connecticut House of Representatives. Its current representative is Matthew Ritter. The district consists of the southeastern part of the town of Bloomfield and northwestern Hartford, including the neighborhoods of Blue Hills and West End. The district is one of few in Connecticut to have a Black majority population. Owing to this fact, it is one of the safest House districts in Connecticut for Democrats; a Republican candidate has not run in the district in over a decade.

List of representatives

Recent elections

External links 
 Google Maps - Connecticut House Districts

References

01